Peter Dreher (26 August 1932 – 20 February 2020) was a German artist and academic teacher. He painted series of landscapes, interiors, flowers and skulls, beginning his series Tag um Tag guter Tag in 1974. As a professor of painting, he influenced artists including Anselm Kiefer. His works have been exhibited internationally.

Life 
Dreher was born in Mannheim, Baden-Württemberg. He began to draw at age seven, determined to become an artist. When Dreher was twelve years old, his father was killed fighting in Russia in World War II.

Dreher studied at the Academy of Fine Arts, Karlsruhe in the 1950s, when the artistic trend was leaning towards figurative, with Karl Hubbuch and Wilhelm Schnarrenberger, who stood for the New Objectivity movement, and with Erich Heckel, one of the founders of Die Brücke. He had his first solo exhibition in 1954 at the Städtische Kunsthalle Mannheim.

Dreher became known for his series Tag um Tag guter Tag which he began in 1974, painting the same glass more than 5,000 times. He also created series of landscapes and interiors, flower pieces and skulls. While Dreher admired some ideas of Andy Warhol, Jasper Johns, Robert Rauschenberg and Claes Oldenburg, he opposed various artistic trends of the 1950s and 1960s, such as abstract expressionism, minimalism, postminimalism and pop art, remaining a realistic and figurative painter.

Dreher was a lecturer of painting at the Academy of Fine Arts, Karlsruhe from 1965 at the Freiburg location, and from 1968 a professor there. Among his students were  Anselm Kiefer, Klaus Merkel and Eva Rosenstiel. He retired from his position as a professor in 1997.

Dreher died in February 2020 at age 87.

Work

Tag um Tag guter Tag 
In a series begun in 1974, Dreher painted the same empty glass. Called Tag um Tag guter Tag (Day by Day, Good Day), he painted it more than 2,500 times at night and more than 2,500 times during the daytime, in a process similar to meditation.

At first, Dreher had only intended to paint the glass five or six times, but found he did not want to stop. He painted the glass at least fifty times a year, and was still painting it in the 2010s, saying he would stop "when the motivation stopped". He always painted it centered on a 25 x 20cm neutral grey ground, from the same distance and at life scale.

Self-portraits 

From 1977 to 1979, Dreher painted on-site several self-portraits as decoration for the library of the University of Freiburg. When the building was demolished, the portraits found a new location.Currently, they are housed in the basement (1 UG.) of the library in between the bookshelves.

Exhibitions 
Dreher's works were shown in international exhibitions including:
 1954: Städtische Kunsthalle Mannheim
 1974: Museum Folkwang, Essen
 1975: 
 1976: , Düsseldorf
 1977: 
 1982: Von der Heydt-Museum, Wuppertal
 1990: 
 1993: , Karlsruhe
 2002: Patricia Sweetow Gallery, San Francisco, California
 2008: 
 2011: Musée d'art moderne et contemporain in Geneva
 2013: MK Galleries, U.K.

Awards 
Among Dreher's awards were:
 1965: Villa Massimo
 1976: Reinhold-Schneider-Preis of Freiburg
 1979:  of Baden-Württemberg
 1995: Erich-Heckel-Preis of Künstlerbund Baden-Württemberg
 2000: Order of Merit of the Federal Republic of Germany

Further reading 
 Dreher, Peter, Peter-Dreher-Stiftung: Hinter dem Spiegel. Behind the mirror. Cologne: Wienand, 2017
 Dreher, Peter: Fragmente. Gläser. Pflanzen. Salzburg: Thomas von Salis, 2015
 Dreher, Peter: Ich. Mich. Freiburg: Albert Baumgarten Verlag, 2014
 Dreher, Peter: Jahrgangsserie und Silberschalen. Pearl series and silverbowls. Freiburg: Albert Baumgarten Verlag, 2014
 Dreher, Peter, Monika Machnicki et al.: Peter Dreher: Tag um Tag guter Tag Freiburg im Breisgau: Modo, 2008.
 Spira, Anthony; Kate Bush. Peter Dreher: Just Painting. London: Occasional Papers, 2014

References

External links 

 
 
 Künstlerbund Baden-Württemberg
 Peter Dreher artnet.de
 Peter Dreher Galerie König
 Lynne Tillman: Peter Dreher (interview) bombmagazine.org
 Yidan Zhang: Peter Dreher: Tag um Tag guter Tag (in German) in 100 Sekunden Kunst, SWR

1932 births
2020 deaths
Recipients of the Cross of the Order of Merit of the Federal Republic of Germany
Artists from Mannheim